Melphina statirides, the brown-margin forest swift, is a butterfly in the family Hesperiidae. It is found in Sierra Leone, Liberia, Ivory Coast, Ghana, Nigeria, Cameroon, Equatorial Guinea, Gabon and the Republic of the Congo. The habitat consists of forests.

The larvae feed on Alchornea cordifolia.

References

Butterflies described in 1896
Erionotini
Butterflies of Africa